Dark Creek is a stream in northwest Randolph, County, Missouri. It is a tributary of the East Fork Little Chariton River. The stream headwaters are just south of the county line to the east of the Thomas Hill Reservoir. The stream flows south to southwest to its confluence just north of U.S. Route 24 between Huntsville and Clifton Hill.

According to a tradition, Dark Creek was so named by a pioneer citizen on a dark night.

See also
List of rivers of Missouri

References

Rivers of Randolph County, Missouri
Rivers of Missouri